Cyrtodactylus manos, the yellow-snouted bent-toed gecko, is a species of gecko endemic to Papua New Guinea .

References

Cyrtodactylus
Reptiles described in 2019